Shehret Feza Hanim (died 1895; meaning "Empyrean fame") was the ethnic Circassian Princess consort of Khedive Isma'il Pasha of Egypt.

Marriage
Shehret Feza married Isma'il Pasha as his first wife before his accession to the throne. She gave birth to two daughters, Princess Tawhida Hanim (died 1888) born in 1850, followed by Princess Fatima Hanim (died 1920), born in 1853. After Isma'il's accession to the throne in 1863, she was given the title of "First Princess", a position at which she remained throughout his entire reign, until his deposition in 1879. In Egypt she was known as Buyuk Hanim or Great Lady. She mostly wore traditional Ottoman garments, featuring a few western details.

After Jamal Nur Qadin's death in 1876, her son, Prince Ali Jamal Pasha was bought up and cared for by Shehret Feza, for whom he never felt more than mildly affectionate gratitude.

Death
Shehret Feza Hanim died in 1895, and was buried in the Khedival Mausoleum, Al-Rifa'i Mosque.

See also
List of consorts of the Muhammad Ali Dynasty

References

Source

External links 

Year of birth unknown
1895 deaths
Egyptian concubines
Egyptian princesses
Muhammad Ali dynasty
Burials in Egypt